Jean-Henri Roger (24 January 1949 – 31 December 2012) was a French film director, screenwriter and actor. He directed the 1983 film Cap Canaille, which was entered into the 33rd Berlin International Film Festival.

Selected filmography
 Neige (1981)
 Cap Canaille (1983)
 Cavale (2003)
 Après la vie (2003)

References

External links

1949 births
2012 deaths
French film directors
French male screenwriters
French screenwriters
French male film actors